Rock of Ages 2: Bigger & Boulder is a tower defense racing video game developed by ACE Team and published by Atlus USA. The game is the sequel to the 2011 Rock of Ages, and was released in August 2017 for Microsoft Windows, PlayStation 4, and Xbox One. A Nintendo Switch port of the game released in May 2019.

Gameplay 

Players must build their boulders, and roll them into the enemy gates as fast as possible, eventually breaking through and squish everything. This simple task is made more difficult by both sides' ability to pepper each other's lanes with traps, obstacles, and defenses.

Development 
Rock of Ages 2 was teased following the release of The Deadly Tower of Monsters, with ACE Team stating to already be "pretty deep in [another project], unannounced yet." In June 2016, this project was announced to be Rock of Ages 2, and that was originally announced for a Q3 2016 release on Windows, PlayStation 4, and Xbox One, but was delayed until 28 August 2017.

Reception 

The game received "generally favourable reviews" on all platforms according to the review aggregation website Metacritic.

Sequel 
A second sequel, Rock of Ages 3: Make & Break, was released for Windows, Nintendo Switch, PlayStation 4, and Xbox One on 21 July 2020, and released for Stadia on 14 August 2020.

References

External links 
 
 

2017 video games
ACE Team games
Atlus games
Multiplayer and single-player video games
Nintendo Switch games
PlayStation 4 games
Racing video games
Sega games
Tower defense video games
Unreal Engine games
Video game sequels
Video games developed in Chile
Windows games
Xbox One games